Defending champion Pete Sampras defeated Goran Ivanišević in the final, 6–7(2–7), 7–6(11–9), 6–4, 3–6, 6–2 to win the gentlemen's singles tennis title at the 1998 Wimbledon Championships. With the win, Sampras equalled Björn Borg's Open Era record of five Wimbledon titles.

Seeds

  Pete Sampras (champion)
  Marcelo Ríos (first round)
  Petr Korda (quarterfinals)
  Greg Rusedski (first round, withdrew)
  Carlos Moyá (second round)
  Pat Rafter (fourth round)
  Yevgeny Kafelnikov (first round)
  Cédric Pioline (first round)
  Richard Krajicek (semifinals)
  Àlex Corretja (first round)
  Jonas Björkman (third round)
  Tim Henman (semifinals)
  Andre Agassi (second round)
  Goran Ivanišević (final)
  Karol Kučera (first round)
  Félix Mantilla (third round)

Qualifying

Draw

Finals

Top half

Section 1

Section 2

Section 3

Section 4

Bottom half

Section 5

Section 6

Section 7

Section 8

References

External links

 1998 Wimbledon Championships – Men's draws and results at the International Tennis Federation

Men's Singles
Wimbledon Championship by year – Men's singles